The Australian Institute of Petroleum (AIP) is a representative body for Australia's petroleum industry. Its headquarters a located in Canberra and it was established in 1976.  The body is managed by a board composed of chief executives, senior representatives and an executive director.

The organisation aims to support the development of sustainable, internationally competitive petroleum products industry.

The four core members are Ampol, BP, Mobil and Shell. Its members own and operate all oil refineries in Australia.

The AIP owns the Australian Marine Oil Spill Centre. It is a member of the Australian Industry Greenhouse Network. The AIP produces a weekly fuel report detailing average prices for transport fuels by location.

See also

Energy in Australia
Road transport in Australia

References

External links

Business organisations based in Australia
Organizations established in 1976
Petroleum industry in Australia
Petroleum organizations
1976 establishments in Australia